Susan Green (born 26 June 1950) is a retired British international fencer. She competed at the 1968, 1972 and 1976 Summer Olympics.

She also represented England and won a gold medal in the team foil event, at the 1970 British Commonwealth Games in Edinburgh, Scotland.

References

1950 births
Living people
British female fencers
Olympic fencers of Great Britain
Fencers at the 1968 Summer Olympics
Fencers at the 1972 Summer Olympics
Fencers at the 1976 Summer Olympics
People from Flixton, Greater Manchester
Commonwealth Games medallists in fencing
Commonwealth Games gold medallists for England
Fencers at the 1970 British Commonwealth Games
Medallists at the 1970 British Commonwealth Games